"Until My Dreams Come True" is a 1969 single by Jack Greene.  "Until My Dreams Come True was Jack Greene's fourth number one on the country charts.  The single spent two weeks at number one and a total of thirteen weeks on the country chart.

Chart performance

References
 

1969 singles
Jack Greene songs
Songs written by Dallas Frazier
1969 songs
Decca Records singles